
Lyons is a surname with several origins. It is the name of an eminent Anglo-Norman family (originally styled de Lyons, or de Leonne, and also spelled Lyon) that is descended from Ingelram de Lyons, Lord of Lyons, who arrived in England with the Norman Conquest, and from his relation, Nicholas de Lyons, who emigrated from Normandy to England in 1080 and was granted lands at Warkworth, Northamptonshire by William of Normandy. The family originated in the district of the Forest of Lyons, north of the town of Lyons-la-Forêt, in Norman Vexin, where their seat was the Castle of Lyons. The original surname was 'de Lyons' ('of [the Forest and Castle] of Lyons'): subsequently, the 'de' was removed from the name, and some branches removed the 's' from the end of the word, producing 'Lyon'.

During the 14th century, a branch of the family emigrated to Scotland, where they became Clan Lyon, the Lords of Glamis, and the Earls of Strathmore and Kinghorne. During the 15th century, a branch of the family emigrated to Ireland, where they established a seat at King's County that became known as River Lyons, and a seat at County Westmeath that was named Ledestown/Ledistown Hall, from which they served as High Sheriff of Westmeath and as High Sheriff of King's County. This branch of the family owned land in Antigua and later removed from Ireland to England. During the 16th and 17th centuries, including after the English Civil War, some members of the family emigrated to America to New York, America. The descendants of the Warkworth family who remained in England had ceased to reside at Warkworth by the 16th century, and resided on estates in Norfolk, Suffolk, and Middlesex. They intermarried with descendants of the branch of the family that had emigrated to Scotland.

There are other families with the surname that are not related to the Anglo-Norman family, including a Celtic Irish family whose name derives from the Celtic word for 'grey' through the Irish names of Ó Laighin and 'Ó Liatháin. However, there were also in Ireland descendants of the Norman family, which had seats in County Offaly and County Westmeath.

People with the surname

A
 Al Lyons  (1918–1965), US baseball player
 Sir Algernon Lyons, Admiral of the Fleet and First and Principal Naval Aide-de-Camp to Queen Victoria
 Andrew Lyons (born 1966), English soccer player
 Anne Theresa Bickerton Lyons, (1815–1894) British Baroness von Würtzburg.
 Anthony Lyons (born c. 1968), British property investor                    
 Austin Lyons also known as Superblue {born 1956) Trinidadian male soca singer

B
 Barry Lyons (footballer) (born 1945), English soccer player
 Barry Lyons (baseball) (born 1960), US baseball player
 Ben Lyons (born 1981), US film critic
 Bert Lyons (footballer) (1902–1981), English footballer
 Bert Lyons (trade unionist) (1929–2008), British trade unionist
 Beverley Lyons, Scottish journalist
 Bill Lyons (born 1958), US baseball player
 Billy Red Lyons (1932–2009), Canadian wrestler
 Bonnie Lyons (born 1944), US writer and educator
 Brittany Lyons (born 1988), Jamaican model
 Brooke Lyons (born 1980), US actress

C
 C. J. Lyons (fl. 2000s), US physician and author
 C. P. Lyons (1915–1998), Canadian outdoorsman
 Charlie Lyons, US film producer and financier
 Charles W. Lyons (1868–1939), American Jesuit and academic administrator
 Claire Lyons, fictional character
 Cliff Lyons (born 1961), Australian rugby league player
 Cliff Lyons (actor) (1901–1974), American motion picture stuntman, second-unit director, and actor
 Curt Lyons (born 1974), US baseball player
 Cyril Lyons (born 1959), Irish athlete in hurling

D
 Dan Lyons, CEO, Centre for Animals and Social Justice
 Dana Lyons (fl. 1970–2000s), US musician and environmental activist
 Daniel Lyons (born 1960), US author
 Danny Lyons (1860–1888), US street gang figure
 Darryn Lyons (born 1965), Australian-born British news photographer
 David Lyons (rugby union, born 1980), Australian rugby player
 David Lyons (actor) (born 1976), Australian television actor
 David Lyons (rugby union, born 1985), English rugby union player
 David Lyons (swimmer) (born 1943), US swimmer
 de Courcy Lyons (cricketer) (1908–1976), Argentine cricketer
 Deb Lyons (fl. 1980–2000s), US singer and songwriter
 Denis Lyons (1935–2014), Irish politician
 Denny Lyons (1866–1929), US baseball player
 Derek Lyons (fl. 2018), American political advisor
 Dicky Lyons (born 1947), US football player
 Donal Lyons (fl. 2000s), Irish politician

E
 Ed Lyons (1923–2009), US baseball player
 Eddie Lyons (1886–1926), US film actor
 Edmund Lyons, 1st Baron Lyons (1790–1858), British diplomat and military leader and Admiral during the Crimean War
 Captain Edmund Moubray Lyons, Royal Navy Captain during Crimean War (1819–1855)
 Edward Lyons (1926–2010), British politician
 Eileen Lyons (born 1941), American politician
 Dame Enid Lyons (1897–1981), Australian politician
 Ernest Lyon (1860–1938), US-Belizean minister, educator, and diplomat
 Eric Lyons (1912–1980), British architect
 Eugene Lyons (1898–1985), US author

F
 Fay-Ann Lyons (born 1980), Trinidadian singer
 Francis Stewart Leland Lyons (1923–1983), Irish historian

G
 Gene Lyons (fl. 1990s), US author and political analyst
 George Lyons (disambiguation), several people
 Graham Lyons (born 1969), Australian rugby player
 Grant Lyons (born 1941), writer

H
 Harry Lyons (1866–1912), US baseball player
 Henry A. Lyons (c. 1809–1872), second Chief Justice of the Supreme Court of California
 Sir Henry George Lyons (1864–1944), geologist and director of the Science Museum in London
 Henry Lyons (b. 1942), former President of the National Baptist Convention
 Hersh Lyons (1915–2008), US baseball player
 Humphrey Lyons (1802–1873), English politician in India

I
 Israel Lyons (1739–1775), English mathematician and botanist

J
 Jack Lyons (disambiguation), several people
 Jacques Judah Lyons (1814–1877), US religious figure
 James J. Lyons (1890–1966), American politician
 James K. Lyons (1960–2007), American film editor and actor
 James L. Lyons (1916–1994), founder of the Monterey Jazz Festival
 James M. Lyons (born 1947), American lawyer, figure in the Whitewater controversy and former federal judicial nominee
 James W. Lyons (1878–1947), Canadian politician
 James Lyons (Upper Canada politician)
 James Lyons (Virginia politician) (1801–1882), Confederate politician
 James "Ace" Lyons, US Navy admiral, former Commander-in-Chief, Pacific Fleet
 Jarryd Lyons (born 1992), Australian rules footballer
 Jason Lyons (born 1970), Australian motorcycle racer
 Jeffrey S. Lyons (1939 or 1940–2015), Canadian lawyer and community activist
 Jeffrey Lyons (born 1944), American television and film critic
 Jimmie Lyons (fl. 1910–1920s), US baseball player
 Jimmy Lyons (1931–1986), US musician
 Jimmy Lyons (footballer) (1897–1970), English footballer
 John Lyons (American football coach) (born 1952), American football coach
 John Lyons (bishop) (1930–2016), Bishop of Ontario, 1932–52
 John Lyons (UK politician) (born 1949), English Labour Party politician
 Captain John Lyons of Antigua, English politician and landowner in Antigua
 Admiral John Lyons (1787 – 1872), Royal Navy officer fought on HMS Victory at the Battle of Trafalgar
 John Lyons (VC) (1823–1867), Irish soldier in the British army, recipient of the Victoria Cross
 John Lyons (ice hockey) (1899–1971), United States ice hockey player who competed in the 1924 Winter Olympics
 John Lyons (horse trainer), author and horse trainer in the field of Natural horsemanship
 John Lyons (hurler) (1923–2005), an Irish sportsperson
 John Lyons (linguist) (1932–2020), English linguist
 John Lyons (poet) (born 1933) is a Trinidad-born poet and artist
 John Lyons (actor) (born 1943), English actor
 John Benignus Lyons (1922–2007), Jack Binignus Lyons, Irish medical historian and author
 John J. Lyons, Secretary of State of New York 1921–1922
 John Lyons (Longford politician), Irish independent / Labour Party politician, represented Longford-Westmeath 1922–27
 Jonathon Lyons (born 1951), British businessman
 Joseph Lyons (1879–1939), Australian Prime Minister
 Joseph M. Lyons (born 1951), US politician
 Judd H. Lyons (born 1962), American general

K
 Katie Lyons (born 1981), British actress
 Ken Lyons (1953–2012), US musician
 Kevin Lyons (1923–2000), Australian politician
 Kim Lyons (born 1973), US athlete and trainer

L
 Laura Lyons (born 1954), US model
 Lauren Lyons (born 2000), US actress
 Leanne "Lelee" Lyons (born 1973), US singer (SWV)
 Leo Lyons (born 1943), English musician
 Leo Lyons (American football) (1892–1976), US football player and manager
 Leonard Lyons (1906–1976), US newspaper columnist
 Leslie A. Lyons (fl. 2000s), US veterinary researcher
 Lorenzo Lyons (1807–1886), US-born missionary in Hawaii
 Louis M. Lyons (1897–1982), US journalist

M
 Mark Lyons, American basketball player in the Israeli Basketball Premier League
 Marty Lyons (born 1957), US football player
 Marty Lyons (Australian footballer) (born 1956), Australian rules footballer
 Mary Lyons (born 1947), British author
 Michael Lyons (disambiguation), several people
 Mick Lyons (English footballer) (born 1951)
 Mick Lyons (Gaelic footballer) (f. 1980s)
 Miriam Lyons (fl. 2000s), Australian academic and political advisor
 Mitch Lyons (born 1970), US football player
 Mossie Lyons (fl. 2000s), Irish football player

N
 Nancy Lyons (born 1930), Australian swimmer
 Nathan Lyons (1930–2016), US artist and photographer
 Ned Lyons (fl. 1800s), US gang leader

O
 Oren Lyons (born 1930), Native American, Faithkeeper of the Turtle Clan

P
 Pat Lyons (1860–1914), US baseball player
 Patrick Lyons (1903–1967), Australian Catholic prelate; Third Bishop of Christchurch, New Zealand, and Fourth Bishop of Sale, Victoria, Australia
 Paul Lyons, several people, famous American comedian, writer, doctors, and authors
 Peter Lyons (disambiguation), several people
 Pratt Lyons (born 1974), US football player

R
 Reginald Lyons (1922–1976), Irish cricketer
 Richard Lyons, 1st Earl Lyons, 1st Viscount Lyons, favourite diplomat of Queen Victoria who served as British Ambassador to the United States, as which he solved the Trent Affair; and as British Ambassador to France, as which he forecast the First World War; and was the founder of the "Lyons School" of British diplomacy.
 [Richard Lyons Otway Pearson|Richard Lyons Pearson, Assistant Commissioner of the Metropolitan Police]].
 Richard Lyons (disambiguation), several people
 Robbie Lyons (1972–2003), US criminal convicted of murder
 Robert Lyons (disambiguation), several people
 Rodney Lyons (born 1962), African-American politician
 Roger Lyons (born 1942), British labor leader
 Ron Lyons (1909–1942), Canadian hockey player
 Ross Lyons (born 1984), Scottish cricketer
 Russell Lyons (born 1957), American mathematician
 Ruth Lyons (disambiguation), several people

S
 Samuel Lyons (1791–1851), Australian landowner and businessman
 Shane Lyons (born 1988), US television personality
 Shelby Lyons (born 1981), US figure skater
 Simon Lyons (born 1982), English football player
 Sophie Lyons (1848–1924), US criminal figure
 Steve Lyons (baseball) (born 1960), US baseball player and announcer
 Steve Lyons (writer) (fl. 2000s), British writer
 Steve Lyons (rugby league), rugby league footballer of the 1970s and 1980s
 Stuart Lyons (1928–1998), British film producer
 Susan Lyons (born 1957), Australian actress
 Susanne Lyons (born 1957), chair of the United States Olympic & Paralympic Committee (USOPC)

T
 Ted Lyons (1900–1986), US baseball player and manager
 Terah Lyons, American artificial intelligence specialist
 Terry Lyons (disambiguation), several people                                
 Terri Lyons, female Trinidadian soca singer
 Thomas Lyons (disambiguation), several people, including Tom and Tommy Lyons
 Tracy Lyons (born 1970), English paedophile convicted in the 2009 Plymouth child abuse case

V
 Virginia V. Lyons (born 1944), US politician

W
 Will Lyons (f. 1990–2000s), British newspaper columnist
 William Lyons (1901–1985), British motorcar businessman
 William L. Lyons (1857–1911), American politician
 Willie James Lyons (1938–1980), American Chicago blues guitarist, singer and songwriter

Z
 Zoe Lyons (born 1971), English comedy performer

See also
 Irish nobility
 Castlelyons (a late medieval seat of the Uí Liatháin)
 Lyons (disambiguation)
 Lions (surname)
 Lyon (surname) 
 Lehane

References
 MacLysaght, Edward, Irish Families: Their Names, Arms and Origins. Irish Academic Press. 4th edition, 1998.
 O'Hart, John, Irish Pedigrees. Dublin: James Duffy and Co. 5th edition, 1892.

Surnames
English-language surnames